Glyphodes onychinalis is a moth of the family Crambidae. It is native to the Afro-Asian Region, including India, Sri Lanka, Hong Kong, Thailand, Indonesia, Japan, Australia (the Northern Territory and Queensland) and New Zealand, and has been recorded in California since 2000.

Adults have a striking brown and white pattern.

The larvae have been recorded feeding on jasmine, Nerium oleander, Gomphocarpus fruticosus and probably also feed on other plants.

References

Moths described in 1854
Glyphodes
Moths of Japan
Insects of West Africa
Moths of Africa
Moths of New Zealand